"Mehr davon" (More of it) is a song by Die Toten Hosen. It is the seventh track on the album Ein kleines bisschen Horrorschau. It was also released as a promo single "We Love You / Mehr davon" in 1992 with a cover of the Rolling Stones.

It is about wanting more money, reputation, speed, hate, sex and power.

Initially it was not released as a single from the album, but it became popular and this is probably the reason behind the 1992 promo single. A "Dreadlock-Mix" was released on Auf dem Kreuzzug ins Glück. An English version, titled "More & More", is available on Love, Peace & Money.

Track listing
A: "We Love You" (Jagger/Richards) − 3:10 (The Rolling Stones cover)
B: "Mehr davon" (von Holst/Frege) - 5:10

Die Toten Hosen songs
Songs written by Campino (singer)
Songs written by Andreas von Holst
1988 songs